August Krumholz (1845, Straß in Steiermark – after June, 1914) was an Austrian architect.

Biography
His father, also named August, was a construction manager from Marburg. He studied architecture at the Academy of Fine Arts, Vienna, from 1864 to 1869, first with Eduard van der Nüll, then  Friedrich von Schmidt. In 1866 and 1869, he was awarded the Academy's Gundel-Prize for excellence. During the latter year, he also participated in a major exhibition in Munich.

He distinguished himself primarily as a school architect. A realschule in Olmütz (the Komenium), built from 1870 to 1874, was his first fully independent design. Through Schmidt's mediation, and support from the educator,  Erasmus Schwab (1831-1917), he created a prototype for a country school building that was displayed at the 1873 Vienna World's Fair. In 1876, he won a competition to establish a community school in Winterberg.

Despite his successes, he gradually withdrew from his profession during the 1880s and became a land owner, joining the Bauernvereins (Farmers' Association) in his father's hometown and introducing Anti-Semitic ideas, derived from the works of Georg von Schönerer. After 1893, he was based in Budapest, where he owned a construction company that provided supplies for the Austro-Hungarian Army. He later moved the company to Vienna, where it went bankrupt in 1906. Two years after that, he opened another architectural studio.

Within a few weeks, the Kronen Zeitung, Austria's largest newspaper, reported that he and his mistress had been arrested in Paris on charges of espionage. According to them, he had been in correspondence with Henri Julliot, a designer for the French firm of Lebaudy Frères, had become interested in their airship, the Patrie, and was in possession of material relating to its construction. The charges were apparently dismissed, following Julliot's intervention, but he was expelled from France.

He largely disappeared after that point. The last time he was mentioned in the press was on June 14, 1914. His date and place of death are unknown.

References

External links

August Krumholz @ Usti-Aussig

1845 births
20th-century deaths
Year of death unknown
Austrian architects
Academy of Fine Arts Vienna alumni
Espionage in Austria
People from Leibnitz District